1234 is a year.

1234, 1, 2, 3, 4, etc. also may refer to:

Musical works

Albums
1234 (Ronnie Wood album) (1981)
1234 (Propaganda album) (1990)
1-2-3-4 (Ray Drummond album) (1997)
1,2,3,4, by The Jeevas (2002)
One Two Three Four (EP) by The Saints, 1977

Songs
"1, 2, 3, 4 (Sumpin' New)", 1995 song by Coolio
"1234" (Feist song), 2007 from The Reminder
"1, 2, 3, 4" (Plain White T's song), 2009, by Plain White T's
"1234", song by Golden Boy with Miss Kittin from Or

Other uses
 1234 Elyna,  main-belt asteroid
 1-2-3-4 (book), 2015 photography book by Anton Corbijn
One Two Three Four: The Beatles in Time, a book by Craig Brown

See also
 Fantastic Four: 1234, a Fantastic Four comic by Grant Morrison and Jae Lee
 4, 3, 2, 1 (disambiguation)